William Millar (24 July 1924 – March 1995) was a Scottish professional footballer.  He played for Aberdeen, Partick Thistle, Stirling Albion, Swindon Town, Gillingham and Accrington Stanley between 1946 and 1957.

References

External links

1924 births
1995 deaths
Scottish footballers
Partick Thistle F.C. players
Aberdeen F.C. players
Stirling Albion F.C. players
Swindon Town F.C. players
Gillingham F.C. players
Accrington Stanley F.C. (1891) players
Kettering Town F.C. players
Macclesfield Town F.C. players
Scottish Football League players
English Football League players
Footballers from Irvine, North Ayrshire
Association football wingers